Lonesome Standard Time is the seventh studio album by American country artist Kathy Mattea. It was released on September 22, 1992 via PolyGram and Mercury Records. It was recorded during a period when she was experiencing vocal challenges. The project featured songs about heartbreak and loss written by various Nashville writers. It received a mixed critical response, but certified gold in the United States. The album spawned four singles. Both the title track and "Standing Knee Deep in a River (Dying of Thirst)" reached the American country chart top 20 in 1993.

Background
Kathy Mattea reached her commercial and career peak by 1992. She had four singles that topped the American country chart won several accolades from the Country Music Association and the Grammy Awards. She was also headlining her own tours. In June 1992, Mattea experienced a busted blood vessel on her vocal chords, which caused her to have surgery. She ended up cancelling several engagements but made a full recovery. All the while, she was making her next studio album titled Lonesome Standard Time. "I feel like I was singing at the peak of anything I've ever done . . . . About halfway through the vocals, this happened," she told The Washington Post. Despite the vocal setback, Mattea finished the project.

Recording and content
Lonesome Standard Time was made at Creative Recording Incorporated, a studio located in Nashville, Tennessee. The album was produced by Brent Maher, who was known for his previous work with The Judds. The album's material was described as introspective while having a production that mixed country with Appalachian and bluegrass styles. Mattea herself described the album as being about "love-lost and inner-soul-searching". She compared its sound to that of her previous album projects. The album included material composed by various musical artists. The sixth track, "Listen to the Radio", was penned by Nanci Griffith. "Amarillo" was co-written by Rodney Crowell and Emmylou Harris. Another track, "Slow Boat", was co-written by Mattea's husband (and songwriter) Jon Vezner. The album's third track, "Standing Knee Deep in a River (Dying of Thirst)", was also recorded by Don Williams around the same time. The eighth track, "33, 45, 78", was composed by Washington D.C. native, Steve Key.

Critical reception

Lonesome Standard Time received mixed reviews from critics and journalists. Jack Hurst of The Chicago Tribune praised the album, commenting that it "offers the kind of arresting music the imaginative title would seem to promise". Meanwhile Alanna Nash of Entertainment Weekly rated the album a "B". Nash found it to be "too reverent and sluggish, and not even the driving bluegrass of the title tune is enough to transcend the album's ultrareflective mood". Brian Mansfield of AllMusic rated it 4.5 out of 5 stars and commented, "Lonesome Standard Time isn't as ambitious as Time Passes By, but it's filled with lovely performances from Mattea's favorite sources: bluegrass ("Lonesome Standard Time"), gospel-influenced country ("Standing Knee Deep in a River (Dying of Thirst)") and Nanci Griffith ("Listen to the Radio").

Release, chart performance and singles
Lonesome Standard Time was released on September 22, 1992 on the PolyGram and Mercury labels. It was originally distributed as a compact disc and as a cassette. In the 2000s and 2010s, it was released digitally for download and streaming purposes. The album first entered the American Billboard Top Country Albums chart on October 24, 1992. It did not climb higher until a 39 percent sales increase in March 1993 brought the album to the number 41 position. It also peaked at the number 182 position on the Billboard 200 chart on October 31, 1992 after seven weeks there. In November 1994, the album certified gold from the Recording Industry Association of America after selling over 500,000 copies. It became her fourth album to receive a certification from the RIAA.

The album spawned a total of four singles between 1992 and 1993. The title track was the first single released and was issued by PolyGram/Mercury in September 1992. By December 1992, the single reached the top 20 of the Billboard Hot Country Songs chart, peaking at the number 11 position. On Canada's RPM Country chart, the single reached the number 14 position. It was followed by the release of "Standing Knee Deep in a River (Dying of Thirst)" in January 1993. The single also reached the Billboard country top 20, peaking at number 19 in April 1993. On the RPM country chart, it reached number 24 around the same period. It was then followed by the release of "Seeds" in April 1993. The song later peaked at number 50 on the Billboard country chart in June 1993. The final single spawned from the album was "Listen to the Radio" in August 1993. Later that month, the song peaked at number 64 on the Hot Country Songs. It was Mattea's lowest charting single up to that point.

Track listing

Personnel
All credits are adapted from the liner notes of Lonesome Standard Time and AllMusic.

Musical personnel

 Eddie Bayers – drums
 Larry Byrom – acoustic guitar, electric guitar
 Bill Cooley – electric guitar
 Jerry Douglas – Dobro
 Sonny Garrish – steel guitar
 John Barlow Jarvis – piano
 Farrell Morris – percussion
 Duncan Mullins – bass guitar
 Bernie Leadon – acoustic guitar, electric guitar
 Kathy Mattea – lead vocals, background vocals
 The Nashville String Machine – strings
 Steve Nathan – piano

 Bobby Ogdin – organ
 Russ Pahl – Dobro
 Don Potter – acoustic guitar, electric guitar
 Matt Rollings – piano
 Pete Wasner – piano
 Tim O'Brien – background vocals
 Donna McElroy – background vocals
 Christie Westmoreland – background vocals
 Gerry Gillespie – background vocals
 Vicki Hampton – background vocals
 Kathy Chiavola – background vocals
 Gary Burr – background vocals
 Jonathan Yudkin – mandolin, violin

Technical personnel
 Archie Jordan – arranger
 Mills Logan – engineer, assistant engineer
 Brent Maher – producer, engineer, mixing
 Jim McKell – engineer, assistant engineer, mixing
 Glenn Meadows – mastering

Charts

Certifications

Release history

References

1992 albums
Albums produced by Brent Maher
Kathy Mattea albums
Mercury Nashville albums
PolyGram albums